Cyphomenes is a small neotropical genus of potter wasps currently containing 3 species.

References

Biological pest control wasps
Potter wasps